Fabienne Fischer, born in 1961 in Zambia, is a lawyer and Swiss politician, a member of the Green Party of Switzerland, elected at the Council of State by-elections for the canton of Geneva on 21 March 2021. She is in charge of the Department of Economy and Employment.

Early life and education 
Fischer was born in Zambia (at that point a British colony), where she spent the first two years of her life, with her parents and two brothers. Her parents were involved in the Protestant church. Her mother Nicole was president of the Protestant Church of Geneva (the first woman to take this post), and her father Jean was Secretary general for the Conference of European Churches. The family then travelled back to Geneva where Fabienne Fischer went to school in Grand-Saconnex.

In 1985, whilst Fabienne Fischer was a student at the University of Geneva, she chaired the Scholarship Board for the National Students’ Union of Switzerland. After a graduate degree in History, she taught humanities from 1987 to 2003 at a local school. She earned second master's degree in law in 2002 and the Geneva bar in 2005. Her work as a lawyer consists of administrative and employment law, as well as family law and amicable settlements of disputes.

She is mother to three children.

Political career 
Fabienne Fischer has been a member of the Green Party of Switzerland since 2007. She was elected municipal councillor for the city of Geneva in 2011, but stepped down in 2012 for professional reasons. In 2021, she became a member of the cantonal office for the Green Party of Switzerland and co-president for the Lancy area.

She sat on the board of directors of the Geneva International Airport from 2012 to 2018, followed by the same role for the Hospice général (welfare office).

Fabienne Fischer won the elections held on 28 March 2021 for the Council of State of Geneva (41.82%), against the resigning Councillor of State Pierre Maudet (33.6%). She was sworn in on 29 April 2021.

References 

1961 births
Living people
Green Party of Switzerland politicians
University of Geneva alumni